Arthur Berriedale Keith (5 April 1879 – 6 October 1944) was a Scottish constitutional lawyer, scholar of Sanskrit and Indologist. He became Regius Professor of Sanskrit and Comparative Philology and Lecturer on the Constitution of the British Empire in the University of Edinburgh. He served in this role from 1914 to 1944.

Biography 
Arthur Berriedale Keith was born in Edinburgh, the fourth child and third son of Davidson Keith (1842–1921), an advertising agent, and Margaret Stobie Keith, née Drysdale (1851–1911). All his five siblings were associated with the British Empire in Burma and India: Sir William John Keith KCSI, ICS, was acting governor of Burma in 1925, Steuart Keith (died 1925) was a sessions judge in Burma, Alan Davidson Keith (died 1928) was a barrister in Burma. Both of his sisters married British expatriates in the region.

Keith was educated at the Royal High School, Edinburgh, the University of Edinburgh (MA 1897; DLitt 1914), and Balliol College, Oxford (BA 1900; BCL 1905; DCL 1911). At Oxford he took Firsts in firsts in classical moderations (1899), in Sanskrit and Pali (1900), and in literae humaniores (1901). He was called to the bar by the Inner Temple in 1904 and became a member of the Faculty of Advocates in 1921.

He joined the Colonial Office as a clerk in 1901, having ranked first in the Home and Indian civil service examinations; he was said to have received the highest marks ever. He remained in the department until 1914, except for a period with the Crown Agents from 1903 to 1905. From 1912 to 1914 he was private secretary to the permanent under-secretary, Sir John Anderson. 

In 1914, he became Regius Professor of Sanskrit and Comparative Philology at the University of Edinburgh. In 1927 he additionally became Lecturer on the Constitution of the British Empire. 

Keith was awarded an honorary LLD from the University of Leeds in 1936. He was elected a Fellow of the British Academy in 1935, but resigned in 1939.

He is buried in Grange Cemetery in Edinburgh with his wife, Margaret Balfour Allan (died 1934). The grave lies on the south side of the central vaults, adjacent to the central archway through the vaults.

Works

Constitutional law and history
 
  (Revised Edition, 1912 ,) (Second Edition, 1928)
 
  , 
 
 
 
  , 
 
 
 
 
 
 
 
 
 
 
 
 
  ,

Indian culture and literature
 
 
 
 
 
 
 
 ‘The Period of the Later Samhitās, the Brahmaņas, the Āraņyakas, and the Upanishads’ in The Cambridge History of India, vol. i (Cambridge:  University Press, 1922).

Translations

References 

 Bibliography
 
 

1879 births
1944 deaths
Academics from Edinburgh
People educated at the Royal High School, Edinburgh
Alumni of the University of Edinburgh
Alumni of Balliol College, Oxford
Academics of the University of Edinburgh
British Sanskrit scholars
Scottish civil servants
20th-century Scottish historians
Scottish Indologists
Scottish legal writers
Scottish philologists
Scottish religious writers
Scottish political writers
Scottish translators
British barristers
Lawyers from Edinburgh
Burials at the Grange Cemetery